Adam Harvey (born 21 December 1974) is an Australian country music singer. Harvey has sold over half a million records, has been nominated five times for an ARIA Music Award and has won nine golden guitars at the Country Music Awards of Australia.

Biography
Harvey got his start musically learning country classics on the guitar as a small boy. His first gig came at the age of ten, and by his school years he was performing rock covers at a club when he was discovered and went off on tour as support for Tania Kernaghan. In 1998 Harvey won his first Country Music (CMAA) Award for 'Vocal Collaboration of the Year' with Tanya Self for "Drive Away". In 2001 he won another CMAA Award for 'Vocal Collaboration of the Year' this time with Beccy Cole, Darren Coggan and Felicity, for "Do I Ever Cross Your Mind".

In 2002, Harvey won two CMAA Awards; 'Album of the Year' and 'Male Vocalist of the Year' for Workin' Overtime. Workin' Overtime was nominated for ARIA Award for Best Country Album at the 2002 ARIA Awards.

In 2004, Harvey won a second CMAA Award for 'Male Vocalist of the Year' that year. In 2005 he received his third ARIA award nomination for Best Country Album Can't Settle for Less. In 2008, he won Album of the Year I'm Doin' Alright.

In 2009, he sang the Australian national anthem before the Australia vs New Zealand rugby league test match.

Harvey has been nominated for a CMAA Award in 2010 for Collaboration of the Year with John Williamson for "King of the Road".

In 2013, Harvey collaborated with Troy Cassar-Daley to record The Great Country Songbook, which debuted at number 2 on the ARIA Charts.

Discography

Studio albums

Compilation albums

Video albums

Awards and nominations

ARIA Awards
Harvey had been nominated for 5 awards at the ARIA Music Awards

|-
| 2002 || Workin' Overtime || Best Country Album ||  
|-
| 2003 || Cowboy Dreams || Best Country Album ||  
|-
| 2005 || Can't Settle for Less || Best Country Album ||  
|-
| 2010 || Both Sides Now || Best Country Album ||  
|-
| 2013 || The Great Country Songbook (with Troy Cassar-Daley) || Best Country Album ||  
|-

CMA Awards
The Country Music Awards of Australia is an annual awards night held in January during the Tamworth Country Music Festival, celebrating recording excellence in the Australian country music industry. Harvey has won nine awards.

 (wins only)
|-
|rowspan="1"| 1998 || "Drive Away" (with Tanya Self) || Vocal Collaboration of the Year || 
|-
|rowspan="1"| 2001 || "Do I Ever Cross Your Mind" (with Beccy Cole, Darren Coggan and Felicity) || Vocal Collaboration of the Year || 
|-
|rowspan="2"| 2002 || Workin' Overtime || Album of the Year || 
|-
| "Shake of a Hand" || Male Vocalist of the Year  || 
|-
|rowspan="1"| 2004 || "Call It Love" || Male Vocalist of the Year || 
|-
|rowspan="1"| 2005 || "That's What You Call a Friend" || Male Vocalist of the Year || 
|-
|rowspan="1"| 2008 || I'm Doin' Alright || Album of the Year || 
|-
|rowspan="1"| 2012 || Falling Into Place || Album of the Year || 
|-
|rowspan="1"| 2022 || Songs from Highway One || Traditional Country Album of the Year || 
|-

References

External links
 
 Official Youtube Channel
 Adam Harvey discography @ Discogs
 [ Adam Harvey] @ AllMusic
 

1974 births
21st-century Australian singers
Australian country singers
Australian singer-songwriters
Living people
Musicians from Victoria (Australia)
Musicians from Geelong
Sony Music Australia artists